Arliss (rendered in its logo as Arli$$) is an American dark comedy series, created by and starring Robert Wuhl (who was also the series' showrunner), about the glitzy, big-money world of professional sports, with Wuhl playing the eternally optimistic and endlessly resourceful L.A. sports agent Arliss Michaels, whose Achilles' heel is his inability to say "no" to clients and employees. Arliss ran for seven seasons and 80 episodes on HBO, from August 10, 1996, to September 8, 2002. After almost two decades of being off-air, the entire catalog of Arliss episodes returned to HBO Max in a streaming format as of September 2022.

The New York Times called the show "One of the freshest shows to come along in a while." It was well-known for taking on very controversial (at the time) topics, including domestic abuse, steroid use, Alzheimer’s disease, gay and transgender athletes, alcoholism, and unwanted athlete pregnancies.

The idea behind Arliss was to show the hype, greed, and hypocrisy of powerful sports agents like Arliss Michaels, and what really happens "behind the scenes" in professional sports. In a 2018 interview with the Hollywood Reporter, Wuhl said the idea for Arliss was based on the book The Art of the Deal by Donald Trump and journalist Tony Schwartz:

I had read The Art of the Deal and I thought, "This is total, 100 percent bullshit. He's saying stuff that I don't believe a fuckin' word of it. He's telling you what happened, but I want to see what really happened." We can use this, as Arliss the sports agent, telling you what happens and then prove he's full of shit and show what really happened.

Over 400 celebrities had cameo appearances on Arliss, including Al Michaels, John Elway, Derek Jeter, Dan Marino, Kobe Bryant, Shaquille O'Neal, Bob Costas, Jimmy Johnson, Picabo Street, Katarina Witt, and Barry Bonds.

Cast
 Robert Wuhl as Arliss Michaels, the president of a sports agency, who tries to cater to his clients' every need as best he can
 Sandra Oh as Rita Wu, Arliss's personal assistant
 Jim Turner as Kirby Carlisle, a middle-aged ex-football star
 Michael Boatman as Stanley Babson, a conservative financial advisor

Series overview

Arliss on other programs
In July 1999, Robert Wuhl appeared, in character as Arliss, on WCW Monday Nitro as a guest announcer, alongside Scott Hudson and Bobby Heenan. He said that his HBO series has featured WCW wrestlers as guest stars, but the Big Three networks were "scared" of doing the same. Arliss said he was scouting Dennis Rodman, who was doing his third stint with the company. Wuhl's appearance was a cross-promotion for HBO, as both it and WCW were owned by Time Warner. In the Arliss episode "To Thy Own Self Be True", WCW creative head Eric Bischoff guest-starred along with wrestlers Lex Luger, Randy Savage, and Gorgeous George.

In The Simpsons season 13 episode "Half-Decent Proposal", Marge is watching Nookie in New York with Patty and Selma, when an announcer states, "Coming up next on BHO [sic], it's Arliss!"; Patty and Selma scream and quickly reach for the remote control.

During the October 12, 2002, episode of Saturday Night Live, guest host Sarah Michelle Gellar delivered the following monologue in a fake television commercial sketch:

In the 30 Rock seventh season premiere, "The Beginning of the End", Kenneth says, in response to Tracy Jordan's marriage having lasted for over 20 years, "That's half as long as it felt Arliss was on TV!"

Former UCB New York stage show The George Lucas Talk Show organized a 7-week-long charity marathon of Arliss episodes during the COVID-19 pandemic in 2020. The hosts watched all seven seasons of the show and interviewed many of the show's writers, producers, and cast, including Wuhl. The livestreams raised over $20,000 for the New York City FoodBank.

Critical reception
Arliss has a 72/100 rating on Metacritic, and 62% on Rotten Tomatoes. The popular show, which ran for seven seasons, has been cited as a "blueprint" for future HBO shows such as Ballers and Entourage, and as an example of how premium cable networks manage their programming. Arliss was cited by a number of HBO subscribers as the sole reason that they paid for the network, and as a result, its fan base was able to keep the show on the air for a lengthy run. The show frequently used obscure sports references, and Entertainment Weekly repeatedly referred to it as one of the worst shows on television; sportswriter Bill Simmons (who would eventually work for HBO itself under his digital banner The Ringer) used Arliss as an example of what he saw as a lack of quality fictional shows about sports.

References

External links

1996 American television series debuts
2002 American television series endings
1990s American sitcoms
2000s American sitcoms
American sports television series
English-language television shows
HBO original programming
Fictional talent agents